Endeavor is an organization headquartered in New York City that supports entrepreneurs with potential for economic and social impact in their regions. The organization provides the entrepreneurs in its network with services that help them grow ventures, create jobs, transform economies, and support future generations of entrepreneurs.

History
Founded in 1997, Endeavor has supported over 50,000 candidates and selected 2,000+ entrepreneurs from 1,200 companies. Supported and mentored by a network of 3,500+ local and global business leaders, these entrepreneurs have created over 650,000 jobs and in 2016 generated $10 billion in revenues. In 2001, Endeavor launched Endeavor Mexico and Time magazine recognized Endeavor's founders as among the "Top 100 Innovators for the 21st Century" in its November 5, 2001, issue.

In 2002, the Schwab Foundation and the World Economic Forum endorsed Endeavor as one of 40 leading examples of social entrepreneurship from around the world.,
In 2007, MercadoLibre was the first Endeavor company to go public on NASDAQ.

In 2008, Wences Casares, one of the first Endeavor entrepreneurs, joined its board of directors. In 2009, Endeavor co-founder Linda Rottenberg co-chairs the World Economic Forum on the Middle East, held in Egypt. In the same year, Endeavor received a commitment of $10 million from the Omidyar Network.
Also in 2009, Endeavor launched its Mentor Capital Program, Global 25 Program, Endeavor Jordan, and Endeavor's Center for High-Impact Entrepreneurship research arm.

Evaluation
As of June 1, 2019, Charity Navigator rates Endeavor as 4 out of 4 stars based on data from FY2017.

Notable Endeavour Entrepreneurs
Guillaume Pousaz of Checkout.com
Achmad Zaky of Bukalapak
Olugbenga Agboola of Flutterwave
Pierpaolo Barbieri of Ualá

Sources 

Organizations established in 1997
Non-profit organizations based in New York City
1997 establishments in New York City